Reken is a municipality in the district of Borken, in North Rhine-Westphalia, Germany. It is located approximately 15 km east of Borken.

Sister Mary Prema hails from this municipality.

References

Borken (district)